IJsselstein is a municipality and city in the Netherlands, in the province of Utrecht. IJsselstein received city rights in 1331. IJsselstein owes its name to the river Hollandse IJssel which flows through the city. It is a major commuting suburb for the Utrecht area, along with the neighbouringing towns Houten and Nieuwegein (in part due to the Sneltram light rail line serving the area). It's surrounded by the municipalities of Utrecht, Montfoort, Lopik, Vijfheerenlanden and Nieuwegein.

Sights

The city has an old town, surrounded by a small canal. A castle stood in IJsselstein from 1300 to 1888; the tower survived. The city has two large churches, both named after St. Nicholas: the Dutch Reformed Nicolaas church, founded in 1310, and a Roman Catholic church. The catholic basilica of St. Nicolaas dates from 1887 and is neo-gothic. It was given the title of 'Basilica Minor' by Pope Paul VI in 1972.

A 366.8 metres high television mast, called the Gerbrandy Tower, is located in IJsselstein. The tower is commonly, and erroneously, referred to as Zendmast Lopik, after the nearby village of Lopik.

Topography

Notable people 

 Arnold, Lord of IJsselstein (1304–1363), the second Lord of IJsselstein and Stoutenburg
 Maximiliaan of Egmont (1509–1548), Count of Buren and Leerdam, and Stadtholder of Friesland 1540 to 1548
 Patrick van den Brink (born 1967), former mayor of IJsselstein
 Marijke van Beukering-Huijbregts (born 1971), former alderwoman of IJsselstein
 Michel Vorm (born 1983), retired football goalkeeper
 Nicki Pouw-Verweij (born 1991), physician and politician

Gallery

References

External links
 
 

 
Municipalities of Utrecht (province)
Populated places in Utrecht (province)